Oncological emergencies are a group of conditions that occur as a direct or indirect result of cancer or its treatment that are potentially life-threatening

These include:
 Hypercalcaemia
 Neutropaenic sepsis
 Tumour lysis syndrome
 Leukostasis
 Raised intracranial pressure
 Spinal cord compression
 Cauda equina syndrome
 Superior vena cava obstruction
 Syndrome of inappropriate antidiuretic hormone secretion (SIADH)
 Disseminated intravascular coagulation

References 

 
Oncology